Forrester Osei (born 12 September 1989) is a Ghanaian weightlifter, competing in the 94 kg category and representing Ghana at international competitions. He competed at 2016 Commonwealth Weightlifting Championships and won gold in his weight division. He competed at World Weightlifting Championships in 2015, 2017, 2019, and 2021. He also competed at the 2019 African Games. He is an executive board member of the International Weightlifting Federation. He is also the Vice Chair of the IWF Athletes' Commission

References

External links 

 

1989 births
Living people
Ghanaian male weightlifters
Commonwealth Games competitors for Ghana
20th-century Ghanaian people
21st-century Ghanaian people
Competitors at the 2019 African Games
Sportspeople from London